Yakuninskaya is a rural locality (a village) in Shelotskoye Rural Settlement, Verkhovazhsky District, Vologda Oblast, Russia. The population was 11 as of 2002.

Geography 
Yakuninskaya is located 58 km southwest of Verkhovazhye (the district's administrative centre) by road. Fofanovskaya is the nearest rural locality.

References 

Rural localities in Verkhovazhsky District